Jean Margaret Hodgkinson (11 October 1926 – 14 October 2016), known by the stage name Jean Alexander, was a British television actress. She was best known to television viewers for her long running role of Hilda Ogden in the soap opera Coronation Street, a role she played from 1964 until 1987, and also as Auntie Wainwright in the long-running sitcom Last of the Summer Wine from 1988 to 2010. For her role in Coronation Street, she won the 1985 Royal Television Society Award for Best Performance, and received a 1988 BAFTA TV Award nomination for Best Actress.

Early life
Jean Margaret Hodgkinson was born at 18 Rhiwlas Street in Toxteth, Liverpool, in 1926, to Nell and Archie Hodgkinson; her father worked as an electrician and the family lived in a terraced house with no indoor lavatory. Alexander had an elder brother, Kenneth. She aspired to become an actress from an early age, and later said that she was inspired by variety acts she saw at the Pavilion theatre in her home city. She attended St Edmund's College for Girls in Princes Park, Toxteth and as a teenager, she joined an amateur theatre group and took elocution lessons.

Career
Alexander spent five years as a library assistant in Liverpool before she began her acting career in 1949 at the Adelphi Guild Theatre in Macclesfield. She first appeared as Florrie in Sheppey by Somerset Maugham. She later worked in rep in Oldham, Stockport and York. Most of her parts were minor, and she also worked as a wardrobe mistress and stage manager. Her television debut is variously given as in the police series Z-Cars  (1962) or in Deadline Midnight (1961).

Coronation Street
Alexander first appeared in Coronation Street in 1962 in a minor role as a landlady. Two years later, she returned to the programme as Hilda Ogden. She started playing the role on 8 July 1964, finally leaving on 25 December 1987. Ogden became highly popular with viewers and Alexander was often identified with her character. In the 40 Years on Coronation Street special, she recounted an incident that had happened years previously: while she was shopping, a fan asked if she was Hilda. She responded in her normal accent, "I beg your pardon?" Taken aback, the fan said, "Oh, don't you talk funny!"

The British League for Hilda Ogden was established in 1979 by Sir John Betjeman, Willis Hall, Russell Harty, Laurence Olivier and Michael Parkinson, among others. In 1984, hundreds of fans sent her condolence cards after the death of her on-screen husband Stan Ogden; the actor who played him, Bernard Youens, died a few months before his character was killed off. In 1985 she received the Royal Television Society Award for her performance on Coronation Street. When she decided to leave the show in 1987, fans started "Save Hilda!" campaigns; however, many were unaware she had made her own decision to depart. Her final scenes in the programme were aired on 25 December 1987, attracting nearly 27 million viewers, the highest number in the show's history.

In 2005 the UK TV Times poll voted her as the "Greatest Soap Opera Star of All Time". On 6 December 2010, Alexander spoke by telephone to ITV's This Morning to discuss her time on Coronation Street on the day of the drama's 50th anniversary episode.

Other roles
In 1988, Alexander made a guest appearance in the long-running BBC comedy series Last of the Summer Wine as Auntie Wainwright, the money-grabbing local junk shop owner. She returned for a second guest appearance in 1989, and finally became a series regular in 1992, remaining until the end of the series in 2010.

Her film credits include Scandal (1989) and Willie's War (1994). Alexander voiced Mrs Santa in the Robbie the Reindeer film Hooves of Fire (1999), and also appeared in Boon and as Lily in the children's series The Phoenix and the Carpet. She starred with Patricia Hodge and Lionel Jeffries in the comedy series Rich Tea and Sympathy, and appeared in the quiz show Cluedo. Later, she appeared in Barbara, Heartbeat, Where the Heart Is and The Afternoon Play.

Personal life and death
Alexander never married, stating that she put her acting career first. She was a close friend of her Coronation Street husband, Bernard Youens. Her autobiography, The Other Side of the Street: The Autobiography of Jean Alexander, was published in 1989.

She lived for many years in Southport, Merseyside, and in 2009 she joined with others to campaign successfully for a temporary library in the town while the central library was being refurbished. She was a keen gardener and after her death was commemorated in the town with a memorial bench at Southport Flower Show, where she was a regular visitor.

She donated her 1955 Qualcast Panther lawnmower to the British Lawnmower Museum in the town, where it is still on display.

Alexander announced her retirement in 2012, two years after her last television appearance. Her acting career lasted for more than 60 years. She celebrated her 90th birthday on 11 October 2016, but was taken ill and died three days later in Southport Hospital.

Filmography

Awards and nominations

References

External links
 

1926 births
2016 deaths
20th-century English actresses
21st-century English actresses
Actresses from Liverpool
English autobiographers
English soap opera actresses
English stage actresses
English television actresses
English voice actresses
People from Southport
British comedy actresses
Women autobiographers